Clóvis Beviláqua (4 October 1859 – 26 July 1944) was a Brazilian jurist, historian and journalist born in Viçosa do Ceará, Ceará, in 1859. Beviláqua was professor of civil and comparative law in Recife. As the author of the Brazilian Civil Code of 1916, whose first draft he presented in 1899, and as that code's first commentator, Beviláqua was the founding father of Brazilian civil law scholarship. He founded and occupied the 14th chair of the Brazilian Academy of Letters, from 1897 until his death in 1944. The chair's patron is Franklin Távora.

References
 
 Alessandro Hirata, Clóvis Beviláqua: o grande civilista da segunda metade do século XIX, in Carta Forense, 4.7.2011

Brazilian journalists
19th-century Brazilian historians
Brazilian jurists
Members of the Brazilian Academy of Letters
1859 births
1944 deaths
20th-century Brazilian historians